Point, Point, Comma... is a 1972 Soviet comedy film directed by Alexander Mitta.

Plot 
The film tells about a schoolboy who no one takes seriously until a new student appears in the classroom.

Cast 
 Sergei Danchenko as Alyosha Zhiltsov (as Seryozha Danchenko)
 Mikhail Kozlovsky as Volka (as Misha Kozlovsky)
 Olga Ryzhnikova as Zhenya Karetnikova (as Olya Ryzhnikova)
 Yuri Nikulin as Zhiltsov
 Zaza Kikvidze as Vakhtang Turmanidze
 Marina Shcherbova as Galya Lushnikova
 Lyudmila Sukhova as Zinochka Kryuchkova (as Lyuda Sukhova)
 Andrey Vasiliev as Vadim Kostrov
 Yevgeny Perov as Ivan Fyodorovich Prikhodko
 Yevgeni Gerasimov as Sasha
Vladimir Zamansky as Karetnikov
Zhanna Prokhorenko as a teacher
Natalya Seleznyova as a doctor

References

External links 
 

1972 films
Films scored by Gennady Gladkov
1970s Russian-language films
Soviet comedy films
1972 comedy films
Films directed by Alexander Mitta